Zekaria Williams (born January 15, 1965) is a former boxer who competed for the Cook Islands

Williams competed at the 1988 Summer Olympics in Seoul, he entered the flyweight division but was beaten in the first round on a unanimous points decision by Soviet boxer Timofey Skryabin who himself went on to win the bronze medal.

1988 Olympic results
Below is the record of Zekaria Williams, a flyweight boxer from the Cook Islands who competed at the 1988 Seoul Olympics:

 Round of 64: lost to Timofey Skryabin (Soviet Union) by decision, 0-5

References

External links
 

1965 births
Living people
Flyweight boxers
Boxers at the 1988 Summer Olympics
Cook Island male boxers
Olympic boxers of the Cook Islands